Sergei Yuriyevich Vozovikov (17 April 1958 – 11 July 1993) was a member of the Soviet Air Force Cosmonaut Training Group 11. His cosmonaut training was to take place from October 1, 1991 to  March 6, 1992. This was cut short when he drowned on July 11, 1993 during water recovery training in the Black Sea, near Anapa, Russia.

Reference 

1958 births
1993 deaths
Russian cosmonauts
Deaths by drowning
Accidental deaths in Russia